FRCN may stand for:
 Federal Radio Corporation of Nigeria
 Fellow of the Royal College of Nursing
 Financial Reporting Council of Nigeria